Yesterday Was Spring  is a 1955  Argentine drama film directed by Fernando Ayala and written by Rodolfo M. Taboada.

The film stars Roberto Escalada as a businessman.

Cast
 Oswaldo Cabrera
 Roberto Escalada
 Analía Gadé
 Carmen Giménez
 José Guisone
 Panchito Lombard
 Víctor Martucci
 Duilio Marzio
 Carmen Monteleone
 Jesús Pampín
 Tomás Simari
 Marcelo Sola
 Orestes Soriani
 Armando de Vicente
 Emilio Vieyra
 Aída Villadeamigo

Release
The film premiered on 20 October 1955.

References

External links
 

1955 films
1950s Spanish-language films
1955 drama films
Films directed by Fernando Ayala
Argentine drama films
Argentine black-and-white films
1950s Argentine films